The 1984–85 Michigan State Spartans men's basketball team represented Michigan State University in the 1984–85 NCAA Division I men's basketball season. The team played their home games at Jenison Field House in East Lansing, Michigan and were members of the Big Ten Conference. They were coached by Jud Heathcote in his ninth year at Michigan State. The Spartans finished with a record of 19–10, 10–8 in Big Ten play to finish in fifth place. They received an at-large bid to the newly-expanded, 64-team NCAA tournament as the No. 10 seed in the Midwest region. It marked the school's first trip to the NCAA tournament since 1979 when they won the championship. There they lost to UAB in the First Round.

Previous season
The Spartans finished the 1983–84 season with a record of 15–13, 8–10 to finish in a tie for fifth place in Big Ten play.

Roster and statistics 

Source

Schedule and results

|-
!colspan=9 style=| Non-conference regular season

|-
!colspan=9 style=| Big 10 regular season

|-
!colspan=9 style=|NCAA Tournament

Awards and honors
 Sam Vincent – All-Big Ten First Team

References

Michigan State Spartans men's basketball seasons
Michigan State
Michigan State
Michigan State Spartans men's b
Michigan State Spartans men's b